Erwin Jaisli (28 January 1937 – 15 January 2022) was a Swiss cyclist. He competed at the 1960 Summer Olympics and the 1964 Summer Olympics.

References

External links
 

1937 births
2022 deaths
Swiss male cyclists
Olympic cyclists of Switzerland
Cyclists at the 1960 Summer Olympics
Cyclists at the 1964 Summer Olympics
Cyclists from Zürich